Trolls: TrollsTopia is an animated streaming television series produced by DreamWorks Animation based on the 3D computer-animated comedy musical films Trolls and Trolls World Tour, and the sequel to Trolls: The Beat Goes On!. The series premiered on Hulu and Peacock on November 19, 2020. A second season was released on March 18, 2021, a third season was released on June 10, 2021,
a fourth season was released on September 2, 2021, a fifth season was released on December 9, 2021, a sixth season was released on February 17, 2022, and a seventh and final season was released on August 11, 2022.

Production 
On January 17, 2020, DreamWorks announced a new Trolls TV series, titled Trolls: TrollsTopia, to be distributed exclusively on Hulu and Peacock. The series was originally scheduled to be released on April 15, 2020. The announcement came alongside those for DreamWorks films The Croods: A New Age and The Boss Baby: Family Business, other DreamWorks and Universal-related properties such as Cleopatra in Space, Where's Waldo?, The Mighty Ones and Madagascar: A Little Wild, and new episodes of Curious George.

Due to the effects of COVID-19 on Peacock's original release schedule, many of the planned originals, including this series, have been delayed. Hulu had not announced any delays and would release the series on schedule. The release date for the series on Hulu was confirmed to be November 19, 2020. The first trailer was released on November 5, 2020.

The first screenshot was seen in the TV Kids magazine's October 2020 issue. Universal had signed a long-term agreement with Sky, with Trolls: TrollsTopia being confirmed to be among the shows included in the contract, which would see customers in Ireland and the United Kingdom getting to see the shows on the aforementioned platform.

In that same month, an storyboard of an episode titled "Dinner with Dante" was leaked onto Tumblr, but was removed shortly afterwards. It revolved around a Classical Troll named Dante Crescendo. At the same time, the series' animatic opening credits sequence was leaked. Jim Mortensen confirmed that the leaks were stolen.

Notable returning staff from Trolls: The Beat Goes On! include Matthew Beans (executive producer), Alex Geringas (composer and songwriter).
Animator and director Jim Mortensen had also returned for the series, but as of February 2020, he left production of the show.

Cast and characters

Main

Amanda Leighton as Queen Poppy, the sweet and optimistic Queen of the Pop Trolls who came up with the TrollsTopia experiment.
 Skylar Astin as Branch, an over-cautious, but good-hearted survivalist Pop Troll and Poppy's boyfriend.
 Lauren Mayhew as Val Thundershock, the ambassador representing the Hard Rock Trolls who resides in Rock Hollow.
 Megan Hilty as Holly Darlin’, the ambassador representing the Country Western Trolls who resides in Country Corral.
 JP Karliak as Dante Crescendo, the royal composer and the ambassador representing the Classical Trolls who resides in Classical Crest.
 Michael-Leon Wooley as Lownote Jones, the ambassador representing the Funk Trolls who resides in Vibe Town.
 Vladimir Caamaño as Synth, the ambassador representing the Techno Trolls who resides in Techno Lagoon.
Charles DeWayne as Demo, a Hard Rock Troll and Val's band manager.
 Eric Lopez as Gust Tumbleweed, a Country Western Troll and the sheriff of Country Corral.
 Jeanine Mason as Minuet Sonata, a Classical Troll who plays the violin and a friend of Dante.
 Kat Graham as Rhythm & Blues, twin Funk Trolls who are scientists and inventors.
 Nisa Ward as Rhythm ("Big Sis B" onwards).
 Talia Thiesfield as Blues ("Big Sis B" onwards).
 Anita Kalathara as Laguna Tidepool, an intelligent Techno Troll "an-troll-pologist".

Supporting

 David Fynn as:
 Biggie, a large, friendly Pop Troll and the owner of Mr. Dinkles.
 Mr. Dinkles, Biggie's pet worm.
 Fryda Wolff as: 
 DJ Suki, a Pop Troll who uses DJ equipment made of insects.
 Satin and Chenille, twin fashionista Pop Trolls who are conjoined by their hair. 
 Fryda Wolff also portrayed Dr. Moonbloom, a medical Pop Troll who has a habit of saying things dramatically. 
 Ron Funches as Cooper, one of the twin princes of the Funk Trolls who was separated from his family and raised by the Pop Trolls.
 Sean T. Krishnan as Guy Diamond, a glittery, naked Pop Troll with a highly auto-tuned voice.
 Kenan Thompson as Tiny Diamond, a baby glittery Pop Troll and Guy Diamond's son.
 Kevin Michael Richardson as Smidge, a small, inordinately strong female Pop Troll with a masculine voice. 
 Tru Valentino as Blaze Powerchord, a Rock Troll who is a talented "mouth guitar" player.
 David Kaye as King Peppy, the former King of the Pop Trolls and Poppy's father.
 Anthony Lee Medina as King Trollex, the king of the Techno Trolls
 Declan Churchil Carter as Keith, a young Pop Troll.
 Abby Ryder Fortson as Priscilla, a young Pop Troll.
 Kyla Carter as CJ Suki, DJ Suki's young niece.  
 Gary Cole as Sky Toronto, the boss and owner of Sky Toronto's Party Shop.
 Matt Lowe as  
 Stripe Smiley, the owner of the candy bar, Fun Dungeon Prize Corner, Tunnel of Friendship & Theme Park.
 Creek, a spiritual Pop Troll.
 Larissa Gallagher as Petra, Val's best friend. She appears in "Bad Hair Day" episode. 
 David Errigo Jr. as Forte Crescendo, Dante's younger brother. 
 Sam Haft as Chaz, the Smooth Jazz troll who hypnotizes the Trolls. He appears in the episode of "Smooth Operator". 
 Judy Alice Lee as Bi-Na, the first of three K-pop Trolls.
 Jennifer Sun Bell as Young, the second of three K-pop Trolls.
 Victoria Grace as Min, the third of three K-pop Trolls.
 Walt Dohrn as Cloud Guy, an anthropomorphic cloud who often makes fun of Branch, Laguna, Lownote, Holly, and Dante. 
 Corina Boettger as Marshtato Mary, a creature who is the enemy of Trolls.

Episodes

Series overview

Season 1 (2020)

Season 2 (2021)

Season 3 (2021)

Season 4 (2021)

Season 5 (2021)

Season 6 (2022)

Season 7 (2022)

Broadcast 
Outside the United States, it aired on YTV in Canada on December 14, 2020. The series will air on DreamWorks Channel Asia.

References

External links 
  at DreamWorks 
  at Hulu
  at Peacock TV
 

2020s American animated television series
2020s American musical comedy television series
2020 American television series debuts
2020s Canadian animated television series
2020 Canadian television series debuts
American children's animated adventure television series
American children's animated comedy television series
American children's animated fantasy television series
American children's animated musical television series
American flash animated television series
Canadian children's animated adventure television series
Canadian children's animated comedy television series
Canadian children's animated fantasy television series
Canadian children's animated musical television series
Canadian flash animated television series
English-language television shows
Peacock (streaming service) original programming
Peacock (streaming service) children's programming
Hulu original programming
Hulu children's programming
Animated television shows based on films
Television series by DreamWorks Animation
Television series by Universal Television
Trolls (franchise)
2022 American television series endings
2022 Canadian television series endings